GAA Killarney are a former Football and Hurling Divisional Team in County Kerry, Ireland and composed of players from the Dr Crokes and Legion clubs. They have won 2 Kerry Senior Football Championships in 1949 and 1983 and 1 Kerry Senior Hurling Championship in 1969 and were beaten in the final in 1951.

Honours
 Kerry Senior Football Championship: (2) 1949, 1983
 Kerry Senior Hurling Championship: (1) 1969
 Kerry Minor Hurling Championship: (3) 1950, 1951, 1952

References

Gaelic games clubs in County Kerry
Gaelic football clubs in County Kerry